Jeroen Lenaers (born 29 April 1984) is a Dutch politician and Member of the European Parliament (MEP) from the Netherlands. He is a member of the Christian Democratic Appeal, part of the European People's Party.

Lenaers previously worked as a policy assistant to Ria Oomen-Ruijten, then Member of the European Parliament for the CDA.

Early life and education
Lenaers studied European Studies at Maastricht University between 2003 and 2008.

Member of the European Parliament, 2014–present
Lenaers was second on the CDA candidate list for the 2014 European Parliament election. He was elected through preference votes.

A member of the European People's Party Group, Lenaers first served on the Committee on Employment and Social Affairs from 2014 until 2019 before moving to the Committee on Civil Liberties, Justice and Home Affairs. In this capacity, he was the Parliament's rapporteur on legislation creating the European Labour Authority (ELA) in 2019. In 2020, he became his parliamentary group's coordinator on the committee and its spokesperson for justice and home affairs. Also in 2020, he also joined the Special Committee on Foreign Interference in all Democratic Processes in the European Union. Since 2021, he has been part of the Parliament's delegation to the Conference on the Future of Europe.

In addition to his committee assignments, Lenaers held the position of vice-chairman of the Parliament's delegation for relations with the countries of Southeast Asia and the Association of Southeast Asian Nations (ASEAN) from 2014 until 2019. Since 2019, he has been part of the delegations for relations with the Mashreq countries and the delegation to the Parliamentary Assembly of the Union for the Mediterranean. He is also a member of the European Parliament Intergroup on LGBT Rights and the European Parliament Intergroup on Trade Unions.

References

External links
Jeroen Lenaers MEP, official site
Page on Parlement.com

1984 births
Living people
People from Weert
Maastricht University alumni
Christian Democratic Appeal MEPs
MEPs for the Netherlands 2014–2019
MEPs for the Netherlands 2019–2024